Vojlovica can refer to:

 Vojlovica Monastery, a monastery in Banat, Vojvodina, Serbia
 Vojlovica, Pančevo, a quarter of the Pančevo city, Serbia